Boyan Iliev (born 21 August 1982) is a Bulgarian former football defender and midfielder. He was raised in Spartak Varna's youth teams.

Career

Levski Sofia
On 2 August 2008 he was transferred to PFC Levski Sofia.

Later, on 5 August 2008, Boyan played in a match against German vice-champion Werder Bremen. He started the match, but he was injured in 33rd minute. He left the match. Anyway, his injury wasn't heavy and Boyan signed his 3-year-contract with Levski on the next day.

Boyan made his official debut for Levski on 13 August 2008 in a match against FC BATE Borisov. He played very well, but Levski lose the match. The result was 0:1 with a home lost.

On 7 December 2008 he was dismissed from Levski and told he was free to look around for a new team.
A few days later Iliev returned to his hometown club Spartak Varna.

Levski Karlovo
In January 2017, Iliev returned to Bulgaria and joined Levski Karlovo.

References

External links
 
 Profile at LevskiSofia.info
 
 

Bulgarian footballers
1982 births
Living people
Association football midfielders
First Professional Football League (Bulgaria) players
PFC Spartak Varna players
PFC Svetkavitsa players
PFC Levski Sofia players
PFC Lokomotiv Plovdiv players
PFC Kaliakra Kavarna players
A.O. Glyfada players
Kalamata F.C. players
FC Levski Karlovo players
Sportspeople from Varna, Bulgaria
Bulgarian expatriate footballers
Expatriate footballers in Greece